Gigen Peak is the summit of Erul Heights on Trinity Peninsula, Antarctic Peninsula, rising to 1083 m on the south side of Benz Pass, and surmounting Russell East Glacier to the west and south, and Cugnot Ice Piedmont to the east.

The peak is named after the settlement of Gigen in northern Bulgaria.

Location
German-British mapping in 1996.

Maps
 Trinity Peninsula. Scale 1:250000 topographic map No. 5697. Institut für Angewandte Geodäsie and British Antarctic Survey, 1996.
 Antarctic Digital Database (ADD). Scale 1:250000 topographic map of Antarctica. Scientific Committee on Antarctic Research (SCAR). Since 1993, regularly updated.

Notes

References
 Bulgarian Antarctic Gazetteer. Antarctic Place-names Commission. (details in Bulgarian, basic data in English)
 SCAR Composite Antarctic Gazetteer.

External links
 Gigen Peak. Copernix satellite image

Mountains of Trinity Peninsula
Bulgaria and the Antarctic